Saulsbury Creek is a  long third-order tributary to Marshyhope Creek in Kent County, Delaware and Caroline County, Maryland.

Variant names
According to the Geographic Names Information System, it has also been known historically as:
Kirks Branch
Saulisbury Creek

Course
Saulsbury Creek rises on the Herring Run divide about 2 miles northwest of Hickman, Delaware, and then flows generally southeast to join Marshyhope Creek at Adamsville, Delaware.

Watershed
Saulsbury Creek drains  of area, receives about 44.2 in/year of precipitation, and is about 8.55% forested.

See also
List of rivers of Delaware

References

Rivers of Delaware
Rivers of Maryland
Rivers of Kent County, Delaware
Rivers of Caroline County, Maryland